Sykia ( is a village in northern Greece, part of Veroia municipality in Imathia, Central Macedonia.

Notes

Further reading

Populated places in Imathia